The 2022–23 Maine Black Bears Men's ice hockey season was the 48th season of play for the program, the 46th season competing at the Division I level, and the 39th in the Hockey East conference. The Black Bears represented the University of Maine and played their home games at Alfond Arena, and were coached by Ben Barr, in his 2nd season as head coach.

Season

Departures

Recruiting

Roster
As of July 4, 2022.

Standings

Schedule and results

|-
!colspan=12 style=";" | Exhibition

|-
!colspan=12 style=";" | 

|-
!colspan=12 style=";" | Regular Season

|-
!colspan=12 style=";" |

Scoring statistics

Goaltending statistics

Rankings

References

2022-23
2022–23 Hockey East men's ice hockey season
2022–23 NCAA Division I men's ice hockey by team
2023 in sports in Maine
2022 in sports in Maine